The 1988 Boston Red Sox season was the 88th season in the franchise's Major League Baseball history. The Red Sox finished first in the American League East with a record of 89 wins and 73 losses, but were then swept by the Oakland Athletics in the ALCS.

The team is best remembered for its change of fortune following its change of manager; after John McNamara was replaced by Joe Morgan, the team won its next 12 games in a stretch nicknamed "Morgan Magic".

Offseason
 December 8, 1987: Lee Smith was traded by the Chicago Cubs to the Red Sox for Al Nipper and Calvin Schiraldi.
January 5, 1988: Dennis Lamp was signed as a free agent with the Red Sox.

Regular season

Highlights
A rough beginning
The 1988 team seemed to start much better than their chaotic 1987 predecessors, going 14–6 in April; however, the team went sour thereafter, especially for Jim Rice as he moved from left field to designated hitter. Dwight Evans also had problems when he played first base, and the usually reliable Lee Smith had problems closing, including giving up a game-winning home run to the Detroit Tigers on Opening Day.

The Red Sox had an 11–16 record in May, followed by a slightly better June with a 14–12 record, but lost pitcher Jeff Sellers when he was hit by a line drive in Cleveland that broke his hand. Wes Gardner was moved from the bullpen to the rotation, but the team and its fans were losing patience.

"Morgan Magic"
At the All-Star break, the Red Sox were 43–42, nine games behind the Tigers in the AL East standings. Management had seen enough, firing John McNamara and elevating third base coach Joe Morgan to manager.

On July 15, the first game after the All-Star break, the Red Sox and Roger Clemens beat the Kansas City Royals and Bret Saberhagen, 3–1. This began a 12-game winning streak, which launched the Red Sox to first place over the slumping Tigers and New York Yankees. The Red Sox would later set an American League record of 24 straight home victories. Two months after Morgan became manager, the team was 81–63 and in first place by  games. The team cooled off in the final two weeks of the season, finishing with nine losses in their final 13 games, but held on to win the AL East, finishing one game ahead of the Tigers, for their second division title in three seasons.

Season standings

Record vs. opponents

Notable transactions
 April 15, 1988: Rick Cerone signed as a free agent with the Red Sox.
 July 29, 1988: Brady Anderson was traded by the Red Sox with minor league pitcher Curt Schilling to the Baltimore Orioles for Mike Boddicker.

Opening Day lineup

Source:

Alumni game
The team held an old-timers game on May 14, before a scheduled home game against the Seattle Mariners. The alumni game marked the 40th anniversary of the 1948 Red Sox team, which had lost a one-game playoff to the Cleveland Indians. The visiting (non-Red Sox) alumni team, skippered by Lou Boudreau—who had been player-manager of the 1948 Cleveland squad—prevailed by an 8–2 score, led by four RBIs from former Pittsburgh Pirate Manny Sanguillén.

Roster

Player stats

Batting

Starters by position
Note: Pos = Position; G = Games played; AB = At bats; H = Hits; Avg. = Batting average; HR = Home runs; RBI = Runs batted in

Other batters
Note: G = Games played; AB = At bats; H = Hits; Avg. = Batting average; HR = Home runs; RBI = Runs batted in

Pitching

Starting pitchers 
Note: G = Games pitched; IP = Innings pitched; W = Wins; L = Losses; ERA = Earned run average; SO = Strikeouts

Other pitchers 
Note: G = Games pitched; IP = Innings pitched; W = Wins; L = Losses; ERA = Earned run average; SO = Strikeouts

Relief pitchers 
Note: G = Games pitched; W = Wins; L = Losses; SV = Saves; ERA = Earned run average; SO = Strikeouts

ALCS

Game 1

Game 2

Game 3

Game 4

Awards and honors
Awards
 Wade Boggs, Silver Slugger Award (3B)
 Roger Clemens, AL Pitcher of the Month (July)
 Mike Greenwell, Silver Slugger Award (OF), AL Player of the Month (June)
 Bruce Hurst, AL Pitcher of the Month (September)

Accomplishments
 Wade Boggs, American League Batting Champion, (.366)
 Wade Boggs, American League Leader, Runs (128)
 Wade Boggs, American League Leader, Doubles (45)
 Wade Boggs, American League Leader, Walks (125)
 Wade Boggs, Major League Baseball Leader, On-base percentage (.476)
 Roger Clemens, American League Leader, Complete Games (14)
 Roger Clemens, American League Leader, Shutouts (8)

All-Star Game
Wade Boggs, third base, starter
Roger Clemens, pitcher, reserve
Mike Greenwell, outfield, reserve

Farm system

The Lynchburg Red Sox replaced the Greensboro Hornets as a Class A affiliate. The Arizona League Red Sox/Mariners (a cooperative team) were added as a Rookie League affiliate.

Arizona League team affiliation shared with the Seattle Mariners

Source:

Notes

References

External links
1988 Boston Red Sox team page at Baseball Reference
1988 Boston Red Sox season at baseball-almanac.com
1988 ALCS Official Souvenir Program

Boston Red Sox seasons
American League East champion seasons
Boston Red Sox
Boston Red Sox
Red Sox